Kim C. Davis (born October 31, 1957) is a Canadian retired ice hockey centre. He played in a total of 36 National Hockey League games for the Pittsburgh Penguins and Toronto Maple Leafs. Davis was born in Flin Flon, Manitoba.  He was also the commissioner of the Manitoba Junior Hockey League from 2002 to 2020.

Career statistics

External links

1957 births
Canadian ice hockey centres
Edmonton Oilers (WHA) draft picks
Ice hockey people from Manitoba
Living people
Manitoba Junior Hockey League executives
Pittsburgh Penguins draft picks
Pittsburgh Penguins players
Sportspeople from Flin Flon
Toronto Maple Leafs players